Resourcesat-2 is a follow on mission to Resourcesat-1 and the eighteenth Indian remote sensing satellite built by Indian Space Research Organisation (ISRO). The new satellite provides the same services as the original Resourcesat-1, but was also designed to "provide data with enhanced multispectral and spatial coverage". Compared to Resourcesat-1, LISS-4 multispectral swath has been enhanced from 23 km to 70 km based on user needs. Suitable changes including miniaturization in payload electronics have been incorporated in Resourcesat-2.

Launch 
Resourcesat-2 along with YouthSat and X-Sat (Singapore) was launched by the Polar Satellite Launch Vehicle PSLV-C16 on 20 April 2011, at 04:42 UTC.

Instruments 
The satellite carries three electrooptical cameras on board: 
 Advanced Wide-Field Sensor (AWiFS) with 56 meter spatial resolution
 The Linear Imaging Self-Scanning Sensor-3 (LISS-3) with 23.5 meter spatial resolution
 The Linear Imaging Self-Scanning Sensor-4 (LISS-4) with 5.8 meter spatial resolution 

Additionally, the satellite carries an AIS-receiver for exactEarth (COMDEV), which is known as exactView 2 (EV 2).

Mission 
The three cameras of ResourceSat-2, were switched on, on 28 April 2011, and the images of high quality were received at Shadnagar Earth Station of the National Remote Sensing Centre of ISRO.

References

External links 
 Resourcesat-2 at the Indian Space Research Organisation 

Earth observation satellites of India
2011 in India
Spacecraft launched in 2011